The birthday cake interview was a live interview on Australian television in March 1993 in which Liberal Party Opposition Leader John Hewson was unable to clearly explain to reporter Mike Willesee whether a birthday cake would cost more or less under his proposed tax reforms. It is remembered as contributing to Hewson's unexpected failure as leader of the Coalition to win the federal election that took place ten days later.

Background 
After winning leadership of the Liberal Party, in November 1991 Hewson launched a comprehensive package of proposed reforms called Fightback!, after years of Australian Labor Party dominance in federal politics. The package included new social structures, industrial reforms and radical economic policies. One of its key elements was the introduction of a consumption tax called the Goods and Services Tax (GST), to be balanced by abolition of a range of other taxes such as sales tax, deep cuts in income tax for the middle and upper-middle classes, and increases in pensions and benefits to compensate the poor for the rise in prices flowing from the GST.

Labor Prime Minister Bob Hawke and his Treasurer John Kerin were unable to mount an effective response, and in December 1991, Paul Keating successfully challenged Hawke and became Prime Minister.

Through 1992, Keating mounted a campaign against the Fightback! package and, particularly, against the GST, which he described as an attack on the working class in that it shifted the tax burden from direct taxation of the wealthy to indirect taxation of the mass of consumers. He famously described Hewson as a "feral abacus".

Interview 
This assault forced Hewson into a partial backdown, agreeing not to levy the GST on food. However, this concession opened him to charges of weakness and inconsistency, and it also complicated the arithmetic of the taxes and benefits package by reducing the scope for the tax cuts, which were the most attractive elements of the package for middle-class voters. A particular problem was coming up with a precise legal definition for 'food'. The complications of the new package were demonstrated in the interview with Mike Willessee on 3 March 1993 on the Nine Network's A Current Affair, in which Hewson was unable to answer a seemingly straightforward question about whether a birthday cake would cost more or less under a Coalition government. He instead made a series of conditional responses about whether the cake would be decorated, have candles on it, and so on.

Willesee: "If I buy a birthday cake from a cake shop and GST is in place, do I pay more or less for that birthday cake?"

Hewson: "...If it is a cake shop, a cake from a cake shop that has sales tax, and it's decorated and has candles as you say, that attracts sales tax, then of course we scrap the sales tax, before the GST is..."

Willesee: "OK — it's just an example. If the answer to a birthday cake is so complex — you do have a problem with the overall GST?"

Aftermath 
The following day, Keating paid a televised visit to a bakery, but the owner told him that although he disliked the proposed GST, taxes under the Labor government already had an adverse effect on his business. Keating appeared surprised that the owner paid both payroll and wholesale sales tax. The Coalition led by Hewson continued to be favoured to win the election on 13 March, with polls until election day predicting a Coalition victory.

However, Hewson was defeated. The birthday cake interview was widely seen as crucial in the loss of what many of his supporters had called an "unloseable election", making his tax proposal seem too complicated and Hewson himself ignorant about it.

After the election Fightback! was declared dead, and Hewson lost the Liberal leadership to Alexander Downer in May 1994 and retired from Parliament in 1995.  The GST was dropped from the Liberal Party's agenda until the 1998 election campaign.

In August 2006, Andrew Denton conducted an in-depth interview with Hewson on the ABC TV program Enough Rope. Upon being shown footage of the birthday cake interview, Hewson commented, "Well I answered the question honestly. The answer's actually right. That doesn't count... I should have told him [Mike Willesee] to get stuffed!"

References 

1993 in Australian television
Interviews
History of taxation in Australia